BBC Janala Mojay Mojay Shekha ('BBC Window Learning with Fun') is a Bangladeshi prime time light entertainment educational game show with comedy sketches for English education. The show was produced by the BBC and broadcast over two series on Bangladesh Television from 16 October 2010 until 7 June 2012.

Overview
BBC Janala Mojay Mojay Shekha is an educational game show teaching English which seeks to motivate audiences to learn English through fun. The game show has a partner programme Bishaash, a supernatural detective drama series.

The game show is hosted by Rumana Malik Munmun. In series two, "Raisa in Bangladesh" features Farzana Dua Elahe and Suzana Ansar as they visit their family and business interests around Bangladesh.

The 24-part first series was aimed at a young audience. There were techniques including role playing where contestants converse in English. The 16-part second series had a different appearance, style and pace.

Cast
Rumana Malik Munmun as Munmun
Kamal Bayazid as Kamal
Alexandra Tyers as Alex
Suzana Ansar as Suzanne
Farzana Dua Elahe as Raisa
 Jannatul Ferdoush Peya
Khairul Islam Pakhi as Sultan

Series overview

Broadcast
BBC Janala Mojay Mojay Shekha was broadcast on Bangladesh Television and Bangladesh Television World from 16 October 2010, It was preceded back-to-back with an episode of Bishaash and reached audiences of 18.1 million.

The game show returned for a 16-part second series on 10 March 2012.

The popularity of the game show led to a rebroadcast of the series.

See also
British Bangladeshi

References

External links

2010 Bangladeshi television series debuts
2012 Bangladeshi television series endings
2010s Bangladeshi television series
Bangladeshi educational television series
Bangladeshi game shows
BBC television game shows
English-language education television programming
English-language television shows
Bengali-language television programming in Bangladesh
British Bangladeshi mass media
2010s game shows